An outdoor 2009 bust of Bernardo O'Higgins by Galvarino Ponce Morel is installed outside the Embassy of Chile in Washington, D.C., in the United States.

See also
 2009 in art
 Bust of Bernardo O'Higgins (Houston)

2009 establishments in Washington, D.C.
2009 sculptures
Busts in Washington, D.C.
Embassy Row
Monuments and memorials in Washington, D.C.
Outdoor sculptures in Washington, D.C.
Sculptures of men in Washington, D.C.